Girls Town is a 1959 film produced by Metro-Goldwyn-Mayer, starring Mamie Van Doren, Mel Tormé, and Ray Anthony. Paul Anka also appears in his first acting role. Van Doren stars as a juvenile delinquent who is sent to a girls' school run by nuns, where she finds herself unable to help her sister. The film capitalizes on the 1950s rebellious-teen exploitation films, with catfights, car races, music from Anka and The Platters, and sexy outfits.

The supporting cast includes the offspring of two major silent cinema stars: Charles Chaplin, Jr. and Harold Lloyd Jr. Also featured is James Mitchum (son of Robert Mitchum) and (as a nun) gossip columnist Sheilah Graham.

Girls Town was lampooned in July 1994 on movie-mocking television series Mystery Science Theater 3000. About 15 minutes of the actual film were cut from this version.

Plot
The movie opens with a young woman fending off an attempted rape. In the process, the would-be rapist accidentally falls off a cliff to his death. Circumstantial evidence places 16-year-old delinquent Silver (played by a 27-year-old Van Doren) at the scene, and she is sent to Girls Town, a rehabilitation village run by a group of nuns. There, she lives with Serafina (Gigi Perreau) and some experienced juvenile delinquents. Trouble and misunderstandings ensue. Troublemaker Fred (Tormé) saw the cliff incident from a distance and realizes it was actually Silver's sister, Mary Lee (Elinor Donahue), who was there. Fred blackmails Mary Lee into being his partner in deadly "hands-off drag racing", then prepares to take her to Tijuana to sell her into the slave trade. Silver finally wins the respect of her Girls Town friends, and finally they rescue Mary Lee.

A subplot involves delusional Serafina believing famous teen idol Jimmy (Anka) is in love with her. During the film, he sings "Lonely Boy", "It's Time to Cry", "Girls Town Blues", and "Ave Maria". A scene set in a nightclub features The Platters singing "Wish It Were Me".

Cast

 Mamie Van Doren as Silver Morgan
 Mel Tormé as Fred Alger
 Ray Anthony as Dick Culdane
 Margaret Hayes as Mother Veronica (billed as Maggie Hayes)
 Paul Anka as Jimmy Parlow
 Cathy Crosby as Singer
 Gigi Perreau as Serafina
 Elinor Donahue as Mary Lee Morgan
 Gloria Talbott as Vida
 Sheilah Graham as Sister Grace
 James Mitchum as Charley (billed as Jim Mitchum)
 Dick Contino as Stan Joyce
 Harold Lloyd Jr. as Chip Gardner
 Charles Chaplin Jr. as Joe Cates
 The Platters as Themselves
 Peggy Moffitt as Flo
 Peter Leeds as Michael Clyde
 Norman Grabowski as Skin (billed as Grabowski)
 Jody Fair as Gloria Barker
 Nan Peterson as Carhop

Box office
According to MGM records, the film earned $375,000 in the US and Canada and $500,000 elsewhere, resulting in a loss of $65,000.

Censorship 
When Girls Town was first released in Italy in 1960 the Committee for the Theatrical Review of the Italian Ministry of Cultural Heritage and Activities imposed the removal of the scene in which Silver is showering while singing "Hey Mama" because it was considered to be offensive to decency. The official document number is: 32004, it was signed on 1 June 1960 by Minister Domenico Magrì.

Mystery Science Theater 3000
Girls Town was featured in episode number 601 of Mystery Science Theater 3000. The episode debuted July 16, 1994, on Comedy Central. The episode featured the debut of the Umbilicus, a tube or tether connecting the Satellite of Love, where Mike Nelson and his robot pals watched the movie, with Deep 13, where the evil scientists who sent him the movies worked and lived.

The episode was ranked number 72 on the Top 100 list of episodes as voted upon by MST3K Season 11 Kickstarter backers. Writer Jim Vorel ranked the episode much higher, placing it at number 20 (out of 191 total MST3K episodes). Vorel laughs at the casting of Mel Torme as the movie's antagonist, although he appreciates Mamie Van Doren's pulchritude, even if she were years older than the juvenile delinquent she was supposed to be playing. Vorel calls the movie "one of the more inherently watchable dramas ever featured on the show".

The MST3K version of Girls Town was included as part of the Mystery Science Theater 3000, Volume XXXIX DVD collection, released by Shout! Factory in November 21, 2017. The other episodes in the four-disc set include The Amazing Transparent Man (episode #623) and Diabolik (episode #1013). The fourth disc, titled "Satellite Dishes", collected non-movie segments from MST3K episodes that are unlikely to be collected on DVD.

See also
 List of American films of 1959

References

External links
 

1959 films
1950s teen drama films
American black-and-white films
American teen drama films
Films about Catholic nuns
Films directed by Charles F. Haas
Metro-Goldwyn-Mayer films
1959 drama films
Films about juvenile delinquency
1950s English-language films
1950s American films